Marsch may refer to:

People 
 Eckart Marsch (born 1947), German physicist
 Jesse Marsch (born 1973), American soccer player

Other uses 

Der Marsch zum Führer, a Nazi propaganda film released in 1940
Gaisburger Marsch, traditional Swabian beef stew
Marsh Railway, a rail line in Germany
Weser Marsch, a district of Lower Saxony, Germany

See also
March (disambiguation)
Marsh (disambiguation)
Mersch